Kevin Bannon (born June 11, 1957) is a former American men's college basketball head coach who most recently served as head coach at Rutgers University from 1997 through 2001. Prior to that he spent eight years as head coach of Rider University's team and seven more as the coach of Trenton State College.

A native of Verona, New Jersey, Bannon graduated from Verona High School in 1975. He holds a bachelor's degree in management from Saint Peter's College in Jersey City, New Jersey and a master's degree in sports management from Virginia Commonwealth University.

During his tenure at Rutgers, Bannon went 59–60 and failed to make the NCAA Tournament, although he was able to take the Scarlet Knights to the NIT. His only appearances in the NCAA Tournament came during his time at Rider, when he led the team to two consecutive berths by winning the Northeast Conference tournament.

Bannon came under fire toward the end of his tenure at Rutgers regarding an incident in a free throw drill during his first year as coach. Players Earl Johnson and Josh Sankes claimed they were forced to remove clothing for each free throw they missed, and then were forced to run wind sprints while naked. Other players claimed the practice was in fun, and expressed their disappointment that Rutgers and Bannon were being sued because of this. Both players transferred from Rutgers, and Johnson filed a lawsuit against the school, which was later reduced to naming Bannon as one of two co-defendants. The suit had originally been dismissed in 1999, but in 2001 was reinstated.

Bannon has not coached on the collegiate level since his firing at Rutgers and most recently was employed by the Mercer County, New Jersey, Park Commission, until 2016 where he served as its executive director.  He was indicted on October 31, 2017, in connection with misuse of public funds and his relationship with the Park District. A resident of the Lawrenceville section of Lawrence Township, Mercer County, New Jersey, he returned to coaching basketball in 2008, acting as the coach for the boy's varsity team at Notre Dame High School in Lawrenceville.   He resigned from that position in 2010.

References

1957 births
Living people
Basketball coaches from New Jersey
Basketball players from New Jersey
People from Lawrence Township, Mercer County, New Jersey
People from Verona, New Jersey
Rider Broncs men's basketball coaches
Rutgers Scarlet Knights men's basketball coaches
Saint Peter's Peacocks men's basketball players
Sportspeople from Essex County, New Jersey
TCNJ Lions men's basketball coaches
Verona High School (New Jersey) alumni
Virginia Commonwealth University alumni
American men's basketball players